Mary Alfonsi (May 23, 1942 – August 25, 2011), better known by her ring name Donna Christanello (also billed as Donna Christianello, Donna Christenello, Donna Christiantello, and Donna Christantello, the names which she went by on her official website), was a professional wrestler trained by The Fabulous Moolah. She was active from the late 1960s through the 1980s. She frequently wrestled women such as Ann Casey, Vicki Williams, Evelyn Stevens and Leilani Kai throughout the 1970s.

Professional wrestling career

National Wrestling Alliance 
Christanello was employed at a restaurant in Pittsburgh when she decided to contact a wrestling promoter to become a professional wrestler. Male wrestlers Waldo Von Erich and Klondike Bill helped set her up with women's wrestling trainer The Fabulous Moolah. She moved to South Carolina in 1963 to train with Moolah. In 1969, Christanello competed during an Australian tour with Toni Rose, Jessica Rodgers, Betty and Rita Boucher, Ramona Isbell, Marva Scott and Evelyn Stevens.

She was the frequent tag team partner of Toni Rose. She and Rose won the National Wrestling Alliance's NWA Women's World Tag Team Championship in 1970. In 1972, she competed at the Superbowl of Wrestling, where she and Rose defended the time World Women's Tag Team Championship against Sandy Parker and Debbie Johnson. They eventually lost the title in October 1973 to Joyce Grable and Vicki Williams at Madison Square Garden in New York. There is also an unrecorded title change. Susan Green and Sandy Parker won the World Tag Team title from Christanello and Rose in November 1971 in Hawaii and lost them in February 1972 to Christanello and Rose in Hong Kong. They also defended the title in the NWA and American Wrestling Association, and the title was eventually integrated into the World Wrestling Federation (WWF). As a result, they were recognized as the first WWF Women's Tag Team Champions.

World Wrestling Federation 
During the mid-1980s she competed in the WWF's women's division. Christianello continued to wrestle in tag team matches. On May 5, 1984, Susan Starr and Christianello defeated Wendi Richter and Peggy Lee. On June 5, 1984, Peggy Lee and Christianello defeated The Fabulous Moolah and Desiree Petersen. The next day Moolah and Petersen defeated the team of Christianello and Judy Martin. On June 9, Moolah and Petersen defeated Martin and Christianello. The following day, Moolah and Petersen once again defeated Christianello and Judy Martin.

In August 1984, Christianello wrestled primarily singles matches. On August 19, Susan Green defeated Christianello. In matches on both August 20 and 21, Susan Starr defeated Christianello. In 1987, she wrestled as part of Sensational Sherri's team at the Survivor Series pay-per-view.

Personal life and death 
Christanello was born and raised in Pittsburgh and was of Italian descent. She lived with The Fabulous Moolah on-and-off for forty years, ending in May 1999 when she moved back to Pittsburgh. While living with Moolah, she helped train women wrestlers Sherri Martel and Brittany Brown. After retiring from the ring, she was employed by Wal-Mart in the accounting department.

Her niece, Marie Minor, was trained by Christanello and worked as a wrestler under the ring name Angie Minelli for several years in the 1980s.

On August 25, 2011, she died from a chronic obstructive pulmonary disease (COPD). She was 69 years old.

Championships and accomplishments 
 Cauliflower Alley Club
 Other honoree (1992)
 Keystone State Wrestling Alliance
 Hall of Fame (2010)
 National Wrestling Alliance
 NWA Women's World Tag Team Championship (4 times) - with Kathy O'Day (1) and Toni Rose (3)
 Professional Wrestling Hall of Fame and Museum
 Lady Wrestler (2009)
Women’s Wrestling Hall of Fame
Class of 2023

Footnotes

References

External links 
 The Official Website of Donna Christantello 
 Donna Christanello at Online World of Wrestling

1942 births
2011 deaths
American female professional wrestlers
American professional wrestlers of Italian descent
Professional wrestlers from Pennsylvania
Professional Wrestling Hall of Fame and Museum
Professional wrestling trainers
21st-century American women
20th-century professional wrestlers